New York City is the most populous city in the United States.

New York City or City of New York may also refer to:

Ships 
 List of ships named New York City
 List of ships named City of New York

Music 
 New York City (band), an American R&B vocal group

Albums 
 New York City (Brazilian Girls album), 2008
 New York City (The Peter Malick Group album) or the title song, 2003
 New York City: The Album, or the title song, by Troy Ave, 2013
 New York City (You're a Woman), or the title song, by Al Kooper, 1971

Songs 
 "New York City" (The Chainsmokers song), 2015
 "New York City" (The Demics song), 1979
 "New York City" (Emigrate song), 2007
 "New York City" (John Lennon and Yoko Ono song), 1972
 "New York City" (Kylie Minogue song), 2019
 "New York City" (Lenny Kravitz song), 2014
 "New York City" (T. Rex song), 1975
 "New York City", by the Armoury Show, 1987
 "New York City", by Brotherhood of Man from Oh Boy!, 1977
 "New York City", by Cub from Come Out Come Out, 1995; covered by They Might Be Giants, 1996
 "New York City", by The Cult from Sonic Temple, 1989
 "New York City", by Hanoi Rocks from Twelve Shots on the Rocks, 2002
 "New York City", by Horse the Band from A Natural Death, 2007
 "New York City", by Joey Ramone from ...Ya Know?, 2012
 "New York City", by Keith Caputo, 2000
 "New York City", by Mason Jennings from Century Spring, 2002
 "New York City", by Moe from Dither, 2001
 "New York City", by Owl City from Cinematic, 2018
 "New York City", by Paul van Dyk from In Between, 2007
 "New York City", by the Statler Brothers from Bed of Rose's, 1970
 "New York City", by Zwol, 1978

Other uses 
 New York City (painting), 1942 painting by Piet Mondrian 
 New York City (video game), a 1984 video game
 "New York City" (AJ and the Queen), a television episode
 New York City FC, an American professional soccer club based in New York City

See also 
 New York, New York (disambiguation)
 New York (disambiguation)
 NYC (disambiguation)
 CNY (disambiguation)
 cony (disambiguation)
 List of cities in New York, for New York State's cities
 City College of New York
 City University of New York
 New City, New York